The Skogsrå, Skogsfrun ('the Mistress of the Forest'), Skogssnuvan, Skogsnymfen ('the Forest Nymph'), Råndan ('the Rå') or Huldran, is a mythical female creature (or rå) of the forest in Swedish folklore.

It appears in the form of a small, beautiful woman with a seemingly friendly temperament. She appears like a woman from the front but seen from behind she often has a tail and a hollow back or skin like tree bark.

Those who are enticed into following her into the forest are never seen again. It was said that any human man who has intercourse with the Skogsrå becomes an introvert, as his soul has remained with her. If the seduced man is a hunter, he may be rewarded with good luck in the hunt, but should he be unfaithful to the Skogsrå, he will be punished with numerous accidents. He may put an end to a stormy night caused by her vengeance by firing a shot against her. Late folklore in Nyland, Finland describes silver bullets as effective means of killing a skogsrå.

Popular culture

 The character Esmeralda (played by Happy Jankell) in SVT's thriller television series Jordskott is called "what traditionally would be described as a skogsrå". She is shown having a hollowed back and the ability to drive people to suicide.
 In 1877, Swedish poet Viktor Rydberg published a poem titled Skogsrået.
 Between 1894 and 1895, Finnish composer Jean Sibelius composed a tone poem based on Rydberg's poem, bearing the same title.
 French Nordic folk group Skáld's adapted Rydberg's poem for their 2022 single Då Månen Sken.

References 

Scandinavian legendary creatures
Swedish folklore

Female legendary creatures
Forest spirits